"Wanna Be with You" is a song by R&B band Earth, Wind & Fire issued as a single in December 1981 by ARC/Columbia Records. The single rose to No. 15 on the US Billboard Hot Soul Singles chart, No. 7 on the UK Blues & Soul Top British Soul Singles chart and No. 40 on the RPM Canadian Pop Singles Chart.

Overview
"Wanna Be with You" was produced by Maurice White and composed by White with Wayne Vaughn. The single's US b-side was an instrumental of an interlude called Kalimba Tree with its UK b-side being a song called My Love. Wanna Be With You, Kalimba Tree and My Love came from EWF's 1981 studio album Raise!.

Critical reception
Don Palmer of Musician proclaimed that "Wanna Be with You" is a relaxed shuffle bump boogie based around a ten note piano vamp. The handclaps provide a solid back beat while the horns and altered vocal yelps exclaim the obvious". Tim de Lisle of Smash Hits called Wanna Be with You "a pleasant surprise, an excellent melody given a fresh jazzy treatment.

"Wanna Be with You" won a Grammy Award in the category of Best R&B Performance by a Duo or Group with Vocals.

Covers
Wanna Be with You was covered by the jazz group Urban Knights on their 1995 album Urban Knights I.

Personnel 

 Writing  - Maurice White, Wayne Vaughn
 Producer - Maurice White
 Assistant producer - Larry Dunn, Verdine White
 Programmer - Larry Dunn

 Arranger - Jerry Hey

Engineers 

 Assistant engineer - Tom Perry
 Mixing engineer - Mick Guzauski, Tom Perry
 Recording engineer - Ken Fowler, Mick Guzauski, Ron Pendragon

Chart positions

References

1981 songs
1981 singles
Columbia Records singles
Earth, Wind & Fire songs
Songs written by Maurice White